Xu Yifan and Zheng Saisai were the defending champions, but lost in the quarterfinals to Johanna Konta and Maria Sanchez.

Raquel Atawo and Abigail Spears won the title for the second time, defeating Darija Jurak and Anastasia Rodionova in the final, 6–3, 6–4.

Seeds

Draw

References

2016 US Open Series
Bank of the West Classic - Doubles
2016 Doubles
Doubles